Rawanduz District is a district in Iraq. This district encompasses one sub-district, Warte, and 12 villages. The district is 123 km from Erbil.

See also
Rawandiz
Bekhal Waterfall

References

Districts of Erbil Governorate